JFK Saldus is a Latvian football club, based in Saldus, playing in the Latvian First League. The team is managed by Raitis Liliensteins.

History
The club was founded in 2012 and its first two seasons were played in the Second League. In 2013, JFK Saldus finished 2nd in the Second League and was promoted to the First League.

League history

Players
Head Coach Raitis Liliensteins

First-team squad
As of 14 May 2015

Notes

External links
  Official website

Saldus
Saldus
2012 establishments in Latvia